Gule may refer to:
 Gule tribe, in northern Sudan
 Gule language, an extinct language of Sudan
 Lars Gule (born 1955), Norwegian philosopher

See also
 The Raindrop (Turkish title: Güle Güle), a 2000 Turkish comedy-drama film

Language and nationality disambiguation pages